Seo Jin-yong (Hangul: 서진용) (born October 2, 1992 in Busan) is a South Korean pitcher for the SSG Landers in the Korea Baseball Organization.

References 

SSG Landers players
KBO League pitchers
South Korean baseball players
1992 births
Living people
Sportspeople from Busan